Uvays Akhtayev Stadion is a multi-purpose stadium in Grozny, Russia. The stadium holds 15,000 people.

Buildings and structures in Grozny
Sport in Grozny
Football venues in Russia
Multi-purpose stadiums in Russia